André Bjerregaard (born 3 September 1991) is a Danish professional footballer who plays as a forward for Holstebro Boldklub.

Club career

Horsens
Bjerregaard came to AC Horsens from Herning Fremad as a youth player. He signed his first professional contract at the age of 18 in July 2010. Bjerregaard played 6 matches in the Danish Superliga for the club in that season.

In the next season, he extended his contract in May 2011 until 2014. The striker had some injuries during the season, but played 9 league matches for the club.

He got his breakthrough in the 2011/12 season, where he played 28 league matches, scoring 2 goals. Though his low scoring-rate, he extended his contract once again. This time in January 2014 until 2016.

Bjerregaard was often described as a "pestilence for the opponent" because of his effort.

KR Reykjavík
On 11 July 2017, Bjerregaard was officially sold to Icelandic club KR Reykjavík.

Hvidovre
On 3 September 2018, Bjerregaard signed for Hvidovre IF.

Skive
Skive IK signed Bjerregaard on 12 January 2019.

Holstebro
On 1 February 2022 it was confirmed, that Bjerregaard had joined Denmark Series club Holstebro Boldklub.

References

External links

1991 births
Living people
Danish men's footballers
Danish expatriate men's footballers
Place of birth missing (living people)
Association football forwards
AC Horsens players
Skive IK players
Knattspyrnufélag Reykjavíkur players
Hvidovre IF players
Middelfart Boldklub players
Danish Superliga players
Danish 2nd Division players
Úrvalsdeild karla (football) players
Danish 1st Division players
Expatriate footballers in Iceland
Danish expatriate sportspeople in Iceland